The Braille pattern dots-145 is a 6-dot braille cell with both top and the middle right dots raised, or an 8-dot braille cell with both top and the upper-middle right dots raised. It is represented by the Unicode code point U+2819, and in Braille ASCII with D.

Unified Braille

In unified international braille, the braille pattern dots-145 is used to represent a voiced dental or alveolar plosive, such as /d/ or /d̪/, and is otherwise assigned as needed.

Table of unified braille values

Other braille

Plus dots 7 and 8

Related to Braille pattern dots-145 are Braille patterns 1457, 1458, and 14578, which are used in 8-dot braille systems, such as Gardner-Salinas and Luxembourgish Braille.

Related 8-dot kantenji patterns

In the Japanese kantenji braille, the standard 8-dot Braille patterns 256, 1256, 2456, and 12456 are the patterns related to Braille pattern dots-145, since the two additional dots of kantenji patterns 0145, 1457, and 01457 are placed above the base 6-dot cell, instead of below, as in standard 8-dot braille.

Kantenji using braille patterns 256, 1256, 2456, or 12456

This listing includes kantenji using Braille pattern dots-145 for all 6349 kanji found in JIS C 6226-1978.

  - 性

Variants and thematic compounds

  -  る/忄 + selector 1  =  壱
  -  selector 4 + る/忄  =  甘
  -  selector 5 + る/忄  =  侖
  -  selector 6 + る/忄  =  婁
  -  数 + #4  =  四

Compounds of 性 and 忄

  -  る/忄 + ほ/方  =  忙
  -  る/忄 + て/扌  =  快
  -  る/忄 + お/頁  =  怏
  -  る/忄 + し/巿  =  怖
  -  る/忄 + け/犬  =  怪
  -  る/忄 + こ/子  =  怯
  -  る/忄 + ⺼  =  恤
  -  る/忄 + や/疒  =  恨
  -  る/忄 + 龸  =  悋
  -  る/忄 + か/金  =  悍
  -  る/忄 + は/辶  =  悔
  -  る/忄 + む/車  =  悛
  -  る/忄 + れ/口  =  悟
  -  る/忄 + 宿  =  悦
  -  る/忄 + ち/竹  =  悩
  -  る/忄 + と/戸  =  悼
  -  る/忄 + せ/食  =  情
  -  る/忄 + 心  =  惚
  -  る/忄 + ね/示  =  惜
  -  る/忄 + い/糹/#2  =  惟
  -  る/忄 + う/宀/#3  =  惨
  -  る/忄 + ら/月  =  惰
  -  る/忄 + ぬ/力  =  惻
  -  る/忄 + ゆ/彳  =  愉
  -  る/忄 + に/氵  =  慄
  -  る/忄 + く/艹  =  慌
  -  る/忄 + め/目  =  慎
  -  る/忄 + ま/石  =  慢
  -  る/忄 + つ/土  =  慣
  -  る/忄 + 仁/亻  =  慨
  -  る/忄 + そ/馬  =  憎
  -  る/忄 + の/禾  =  憐
  -  る/忄 + ふ/女  =  憤
  -  る/忄 + り/分  =  憧
  -  る/忄 + も/門  =  憫
  -  る/忄 + な/亻  =  憶
  -  る/忄 + ひ/辶  =  憾
  -  る/忄 + 囗  =  懊
  -  る/忄 + る/忄  =  懐
  -  る/忄 + る/忄 + る/忄  =  懷
  -  る/忄 + 比 + し/巿  =  忖
  -  る/忄 + そ/馬 + selector 4  =  忤
  -  る/忄 + 宿 + お/頁  =  忰
  -  る/忄 + 宿 + 龸  =  忱
  -  る/忄 + selector 3 + そ/馬  =  忸
  -  る/忄 + 比 + を/貝  =  忻
  -  る/忄 + 日  =  恒
  -  る/忄 + み/耳  =  懺
  -  る/忄 + る/忄  =  懐
  -  る/忄 + も/門 + selector 5  =  怐
  -  る/忄 + 日 + selector 1  =  怕
  -  る/忄 + れ/口 + ろ/十  =  怙
  -  る/忄 + selector 4 + 日  =  怛
  -  る/忄 + 仁/亻 + ろ/十  =  怜
  -  る/忄 + selector 4 + な/亻  =  怡
  -  る/忄 + り/分 + か/金  =  怦
  -  る/忄 + と/戸 + 仁/亻  =  怩
  -  る/忄 + 宿 + め/目  =  怫
  -  る/忄 + 氷/氵 + selector 4  =  怺
  -  る/忄 + 日 + す/発  =  恂
  -  る/忄 + つ/土 + し/巿  =  恃
  -  る/忄 + 宿 + ぬ/力  =  恊
  -  る/忄 + 龸 + selector 2  =  恍
  -  る/忄 + 宿 + も/門  =  恟
  -  る/忄 + ろ/十 + つ/土  =  恠
  -  る/忄 + よ/广 + 火  =  恢
  -  る/忄 + る/忄 + 日  =  恆
  -  る/忄 + る/忄 + ち/竹  =  惱
  -  る/忄 + る/忄 + め/目  =  愼
  -  る/忄 + る/忄 + う/宀/#3  =  慘
  -  selector 1 + る/忄 + み/耳  =  懴
  -  る/忄 + す/発 + れ/口  =  恪
  -  る/忄 + 囗 + と/戸  =  恫
  -  る/忄 + れ/口 + せ/食  =  恬
  -  る/忄 + り/分 + 囗  =  恰
  -  る/忄 + 宿 + ら/月  =  悁
  -  る/忄 + 囗 + き/木  =  悃
  -  る/忄 + そ/馬 + ⺼  =  悄
  -  る/忄 + ゆ/彳 + 宿  =  悌
  -  る/忄 + 囗 + ひ/辶  =  悒
  -  る/忄 + 宿 + ろ/十  =  悖
  -  る/忄 + ぬ/力 + 宿  =  悗
  -  る/忄 + き/木 + 数  =  悚
  -  る/忄 + の/禾 + ぬ/力  =  悧
  -  る/忄 + お/頁 + ろ/十  =  悴
  -  る/忄 + selector 4 + と/戸  =  悵
  -  る/忄 + の/禾 + こ/子  =  悸
  -  る/忄 + ふ/女 + さ/阝  =  悽
  -  る/忄 + 囗 + つ/土  =  惆
  -  る/忄 + 龸 + こ/子  =  惇
  -  る/忄 + け/犬 + さ/阝  =  惓
  -  る/忄 + selector 5 + ほ/方  =  惘
  -  る/忄 + を/貝 + selector 5  =  惧
  -  る/忄 + 宿 + の/禾  =  惴
  -  る/忄 + 日 + へ/⺩  =  惶
  -  る/忄 + 日 + い/糹/#2  =  惺
  -  る/忄 + の/禾 + 火  =  愀
  -  る/忄 + う/宀/#3 + 日  =  愃
  -  る/忄 + 宿 + す/発  =  愎
  -  る/忄 + 宿 + け/犬  =  愕
  -  る/忄 + 宿 + こ/子  =  愡
  -  る/忄 + お/頁 + に/氵  =  愧
  -  る/忄 + り/分 + お/頁  =  愴
  -  る/忄 + も/門 + selector 1  =  愾
  -  る/忄 + り/分 + け/犬  =  慊
  -  る/忄 + 宿 + ⺼  =  慍
  -  る/忄 + に/氵 + ね/示  =  慓
  -  る/忄 + 龸 + む/車  =  慚
  -  る/忄 + り/分 + ぬ/力  =  慟
  -  る/忄 + は/辶 + く/艹  =  慥
  -  る/忄 + 宿 + 数  =  慯
  -  る/忄 + 宿 + て/扌  =  慱
  -  る/忄 + つ/土 + す/発  =  慳
  -  る/忄 + む/車 + 日  =  慴
  -  る/忄 + よ/广 + 囗  =  慵
  -  る/忄 + よ/广 + ゆ/彳  =  慷
  -  る/忄 + い/糹/#2 + 火  =  憔
  -  る/忄 + れ/口 + れ/口  =  憚
  -  る/忄 + 日 + れ/口  =  憬
  -  る/忄 + む/車 + 火  =  憮
  -  る/忄 + 宿 + 日  =  憺
  -  る/忄 + れ/口 + う/宀/#3  =  懆
  -  る/忄 + 囗 + そ/馬  =  懈
  -  る/忄 + 宿 + た/⽥  =  懌
  -  る/忄 + 囗 + れ/口  =  懍
  -  る/忄 + ち/竹 + の/禾  =  懦
  -  る/忄 + お/頁 + 数  =  懶
  -  る/忄 + 宿 + い/糹/#2  =  懼
  -  る/忄 + 龸 + け/犬  =  懽
  -  る/忄 + み/耳 + み/耳  =  懾

Compounds of 㣺 and 心

  -  仁/亻 + る/忄  =  偲
  -  れ/口 + る/忄  =  唸
  -  き/木 + る/忄  =  忌
  -  け/犬 + る/忄  =  忝
  -  こ/子 + る/忄  =  恭
  -  そ/馬 + る/忄  =  惣
  -  く/艹 + る/忄  =  慕
  -  め/目 + る/忄  =  懸
  -  て/扌 + る/忄  =  捻
  -  氷/氵 + る/忄  =  添
  -  の/禾 + る/忄  =  穏
  -  さ/阝 + る/忄  =  隠
  -  る/忄 + selector 6 + さ/阝  =  怎
  -  る/忄 + 仁/亻 + に/氵  =  恁
  -  る/忄 + 氷/氵 + ん/止  =  恣
  -  る/忄 + な/亻 + き/木  =  恷
  -  る/忄 + ろ/十 + め/目  =  悳
  -  る/忄 + け/犬 + 日  =  惷
  -  る/忄 + く/艹 + 数  =  惹
  -  る/忄 + 宿 + ゆ/彳  =  愆
  -  る/忄 + み/耳 + ん/止  =  愍
  -  る/忄 + つ/土 + ゑ/訁  =  愨
  -  る/忄 + ら/月 + は/辶  =  愬
  -  る/忄 + よ/广 + selector 1  =  愿
  -  る/忄 + 宿 + つ/土  =  慂
  -  る/忄 + む/車 + を/貝  =  慙
  -  る/忄 + も/門 + 数  =  慝
  -  る/忄 + ゆ/彳 + よ/广  =  慫
  -  る/忄 + た/⽥ + ん/止  =  慾
  -  る/忄 + な/亻 + ひ/辶  =  憊
  -  る/忄 + き/木 + な/亻  =  憖
  -  る/忄 + つ/土 + 囗  =  憙
  -  る/忄 + selector 1 + よ/广  =  懋
  -  る/忄 + に/氵 + め/目  =  懣
  -  の/禾 + の/禾 + る/忄  =  穩
  -  さ/阝 + さ/阝 + る/忄  =  隱
  -  る/忄 + 宿 + ん/止  =  懿

Compounds of 壱

  -  る/忄 + る/忄 + selector 1  =  壹
  -  れ/口 + る/忄 + selector 1  =  噎
  -  ほ/方 + る/忄 + selector 1  =  殪
  -  せ/食 + る/忄 + selector 1  =  饐
  - #1 + る/忄 + selector 1  =  弌

Compounds of 甘

  -  せ/食 + る/忄  =  甜
  -  ゐ/幺 + る/忄  =  紺
  -  る/忄 + き/木  =  某
  -  ゑ/訁 + る/忄  =  謀
  -  火 + る/忄  =  煤
  -  ふ/女 + る/忄  =  媒
  -  心 + る/忄 + き/木  =  楳
  -  つ/土 + selector 4 + る/忄  =  坩
  -  て/扌 + selector 4 + る/忄  =  拑
  -  ち/竹 + selector 4 + る/忄  =  箝
  -  心 + selector 4 + る/忄  =  柑
  -  や/疒 + selector 4 + る/忄  =  疳
  -  む/車 + selector 4 + る/忄  =  蚶
  -  さ/阝 + selector 4 + る/忄  =  邯
  -  せ/食 + selector 4 + る/忄  =  酣
  -  か/金 + selector 4 + る/忄  =  鉗
  -  龸 + selector 4 + る/忄  =  甞

Compounds of 侖

  -  な/亻 + る/忄  =  倫
  -  え/訁 + る/忄  =  論
  -  む/車 + る/忄  =  輪
  -  や/疒 + 龸 + る/忄  =  崘
  -  や/疒 + う/宀/#3 + る/忄  =  崙
  -  き/木 + 宿 + る/忄  =  棆
  -  に/氵 + 宿 + る/忄  =  淪
  -  い/糹/#2 + 宿 + る/忄  =  綸

Compounds of 婁

  -  い/糹/#2 + る/忄  =  縷
  -  な/亻 + 宿 + る/忄  =  僂
  -  や/疒 + 宿 + る/忄  =  瘻
  -  ち/竹 + 宿 + る/忄  =  簍
  -  む/車 + 宿 + る/忄  =  螻
  -  ね/示 + 宿 + る/忄  =  褸
  -  か/金 + 宿 + る/忄  =  鏤

Compounds of 四

  -  に/氵 + 数 + る/忄  =  泗
  -  そ/馬 + 数 + る/忄  =  駟

Other compounds

  -  き/木 + 数 + る/忄  =  楞
  -  と/戸 + る/忄  =  屡
  -  よ/广 + る/忄  =  庵
  -  す/発 + る/忄  =  罨
  -  つ/土 + る/忄  =  壊
  -  へ/⺩ + る/忄  =  環
  -  ひ/辶 + る/忄  =  還
  -  囗 + 宿 + る/忄  =  圜
  -  つ/土 + つ/土 + る/忄  =  壞
  -  う/宀/#3 + 宿 + る/忄  =  寰
  -  か/金 + 龸 + る/忄  =  鐶
  -  と/戸 + う/宀/#3 + る/忄  =  鬟

Notes

Braille patterns